Panagiotis Kambas (born 1891, date of death unknown) was a Greek fencer. He competed in the team épée event at the 1912 Summer Olympics.

References

1891 births
Year of death missing
Greek male fencers
Olympic fencers of Greece
Fencers at the 1912 Summer Olympics
20th-century Greek people